Otsego is an unincorporated community in Wood County, in the U.S. state of Ohio.

History
Otsego had its start before 1834 when a sawmill was built there.

References

Unincorporated communities in Wood County, Ohio
Unincorporated communities in Ohio